HKG can mean the following:

 Hong Kong International Airport or Chek Lap Kok Airport, IATA code
 Kai Tak Airport, former Hong Kong International Airport
 Hong Kong, ISO 3166-2:HK country code
 Port of Hong Kong, the seaport of Hong Kong

See also

 
 
 HK (disambiguation)
 Hgk (disambiguation)
 GKH (disambiguation)
 GHK (disambiguation)
 KGH (disambiguation)
 KHG (disambiguation)